Timing diagram may refer to:

 Digital timing diagram
 Timing diagram (Unified Modeling Language)
 Time–distance diagram